Roy Julen (born May, 1986) is a Dutch tap dancer, actor, and choreographer of Surinamese origin.

Career
Roy Julen is a well reputed choreographer with many credits on distinguished productions in the entertainment industry.
He has been the executive Choreographer and creative producer for more than 8 years on Dutch and Belgian television show So You Think You Can Dance, The Voice, The ultimate dance battle, Dance Date and The Band as well as the choreographer of the acclaimed American hitmusical Flashdance for Joop van den Ende Theatre productions.

Julen has choreographed live events, music videos, and television productions as well for many world famous pop artists, including Diana Ross, Jason DeRulo, Taio Cruz, Pixie Lott, and Stromae, to name a few.
Besides being a choreographer, Roy created his own successful dance movie "Body language, which was awarded with a Dutch Golden Film Award and was shown in movie theaters in The Netherlands as well as internationally in seven countries.
As an individual with significant experience and achievement in the fields of choreography, film, Tv and events Julen is considered by other professionals in the industry to be an accomplished expert in these areas.

References

External links

1976 births
Living people
Dutch people of Surinamese descent
Tap dancers
Dutch male film actors
Dutch choreographers